List by Family Name: A - B - C - D - E - F - G - H - I - J - K - M - N - O - R - S - T - U - W - Y - Z

Saigyō (1118–1190)
Saitō Mokichi (1882–1953)
Saitō Ryokuu (1868–1904)
Saitō Sakae  (born 1933)
Sakaguchi Ango (1906–1955)
Saotome Mitsugu (born 1926)
Sasaki Nobutsuna
Sata Ineko (1904–1998)
Sei Shōnagon
Seii James Allen Kōichi Moriwaki
Senge Motomaro (1888–1948)
Shiba Ryōtarō (born 1923)
Shibusawa Tatsuhiko (1928–1987)
Shiga Mitsuko (1885–1956)
Shiga Naoya (1883–1971)
Shimada Masahiko (born 1961)
Shimaki Kensaku (1903–1945)
Shimao Toshio (1917–1986)
Shimazaki Tōson (1872–1943)
Shimizu Motoyoshi (born 1918)
Shimizu Satomu (see Yamamoto Shūgorō)
Shimizu Shikin (1868–1933)
Shimizu Yoshinori (born 1947)
Shiono Nanami (born 1937)
Shiraki Shizu (1895–1918)
Shōno Junzō (born 1921)
Kin'yuki Sonoike (1886-1974)
Suematsu Kenchō (1855–1920)
Suzuki Kōji (born 1957)
Suzuki Miekichi (1882–1936)

S